War Dogs, or wardog, or variant, may refer to:

Art, entertainment, and media
Films
 War Dogs (1942 film), an American film directed by S. Roy Luby
 War Dogs (1943 film), an animated short subject by Hanna-Barbera
 War Dogs (2016 film), an American film directed by Todd Phillips

Literature
War Dogs (novel) (2014), a science-fiction novel by Greg Bear

Fictional entities
 WARDOG, a fictional character from the videogame series SOCOM (series)
 WarDog, a fictional character from the comic SpyCat
 The Wardogs, a fictional team from the videogame Manhunt (video game)

Warfare
Dogs in warfare, the use of dogs in combat
Mercenaries, soldiers who take part in a conflict for personal gain

Other uses
 Columbus Wardogs, defunct arena football (gridiron) team from Columbus, Georgia, USA

See also 
 The Dogs of War (disambiguation)
 War Dog Memorial (disambiguation)